Pia (피아) was a South Korean alternative rock band formed in Busan in 1998. Meaning 'the Universe and I' or 'You and I' in Chinese characters (Pi:彼 A:我), Pia was originally formed by Hullang Lee (guitar), Kibum Kim (bass) and Yohan Ok (lead singer) who were later joined by Simz No (fx, keyboard) and, after several member changes on drums, Hye Seung Yang (drums). The band has maintained this line-up ever since their first official gig together, the 2001 Ssamzie Festival.

After touring in local clubs and rock festivals for a few years, they relocated to Seoul and released their debut album Pia@ArrogantEmpire.xxx in March 2001. Having gradually gained momentum, the band made a breakthrough at the 2002 ETP FEST and eventually signed to Goesoo Indiegene, a major label established by Seo Taiji, one of Korea's most prominent musicians. After releasing three studio albums 3rd Phase (2003), Become Clear (2005), Waterfalls (2007) and an EP Urban Explorer (2008) through Goesoo, Pia left the label in 2009 and joined WinWon Entertainment in 2011, releasing their fifth studio album Pentagram that year.

While Pia originally began as a nu metal/hardcore band recognized for their heavy guitar sound and Yohan's powerful screaming vocals, their musical style has changed significantly over the years. Having explored various genres such as alternative metal, emo core, garage rock, alternative rock, synthpop, and such, their current music is considered to be alternative rock and electronic rock. While their albums have generally become softer and more melodic with increasing electronic influences, Pia has consistently incorporated their original heavy and powerful sound to their evolving style.

History

Formation, name, and early years (~2001)
Lead singer Yohan and guitarist Hullang met while Yohan was in a death metal band called "Sleep in Pain" and Hullang in "C.O.B." as one of Busan's most prospective thrash metal guitarists. The two bands had been in a sort of rivalry when they met at a concert after-party through mutual friends, a Korean metal band named "Rainy Sun", and the two began a close friendship since. During his mandatory military service, Yohan met Kibum who had played the guitar in college bands and became acquaintances. In 1998 after their military services, Yohan and Hullang gathered to form the band Pia, and after searching for a bassist, they recruited Kibum who had changed to bass to play in the military band.

The name "Pia", which is formed of two Chinese characters Pi(彼), meaning 'you', and A(我), meaning 'I', comes from the name of bands soldiers wear to identify friends from foes (피아식별띠). Yohan took notice of this during his service and decided to name the band Pia, with a motto of "the world consists of friends or foes." This original, somewhat aggressive meaning of the band name gradually softened, along with their music style, to mean 'you and I', and thus the universe.

After recruiting drummer Min Yong Shin, Pia began touring clubs and rock festivals all over the nation, and in 1999 they participated in Indie Power 1999, a compilation album of several then popular underground bands covering hit songs. In August that year, they entered the 2nd MBC Rock Festival in Busan and won the grand prize for their song "Oil Lump" which was later included in their first album.

In 2000, Pia relocated to Seoul to record their first studio album, and recruited Simz for turntables and sampling and replaced drummer Shin with Da Hee Kang. While recording demos and spreading sample CDs, Pia actively performed live and again participated in Indie Power 2001. During this time, Pia's music was heavily influenced by the heavy metal, hardcore, and nu metal scene and bands such as Korn, Slipknot, Pantera, and Limp Bizkit, and this continued to their first studio album Pia@ArrogantEmpire.xxx.

Pia@ArrogantEmpire.xxx and Goesoo Indigene
On 22 March 2001, Pia released their debut album titled Pia@ArrogantEmpire.xxx through Rock Korea and was a success among critics and fans alike. The band spent around a year making this album with Heung-Chan Ahn from the South Korean thrash metal band Crash as their producer. Ahn utilized the methods he learnt from Colin Richardson to produce a quality sound uncommon in Korea at that time. Many praise this album for its sharp yet thick sound and Yohan's aggressive, rage-filled screaming and growling vocals. The lyrics convey a sense of alienation, despair, rage, and cynicism that comes from our daily lives.

Pia toured in various clubs and festivals to promote the album, including the 2001 Ssamzie Festival. The band has revealed that they feel embarrassed when looking at their live gigs from these days because while their energy and vibe is incomparable, their actual performances were horrible. However, Seo Taiji took notice of their performance from Ssamzie and selected Pia to play at the 2002 ETP Festival alongside artists such as hyde, Tommy Lee and Seo Taiji himself. At the end of the same year they signed their first major label record deal with Seotaiji Company.

After the deal was announced, many criticized the band for selling out and worried the band would compromise their signature heavy dark sound to fit the public's taste. To add on, despite a major label debut, the general unpopularity of the K-rock scene put Pia in an ambiguous stance, as although they were officially a major label band they were still largely unknown to the public similar to underground bands. This would be the motif of their second album title, "3rd Phase".

"3rd Phase"
Their second album "3rd Phase" was their first album after they signed with Seotaiji Company, and was very much anticipated by fans who were curious of how their sound would progress or change. The sound in this album is less heavier and more melodic, with a wider range of style than their previous album. Some fans were disappointed by this change and accused Seotaiji for steering Pia into becoming a public-friendly band. However, the album was self-produced with only minor influence from Seotaiji who mostly assisted the technical aspect of the sound. Pia has also mentioned several times that their music style choices were never based on popularity but on the music they like and are inspired at that time while making the album.
Only one single was released from this album, "Gloomy Sunday", which received a fair amount of airplay.

It was from this point that Pia emphasized their wish to communicate with fans and audiences through their live shows. The band's name "Pia", which originally means friends or foes, was softened to mean 'You and I', and thus 'Us'.
The group also began gaining some international fame. After performing at several of their own concerts, Pia performed with Linkin Park in October, and Limp Bizkit in December 2003. In May 2004, Pia joined Seo Taiji in Vladivostok, Russia and spread Korea rock music to Russian rock fans. The following month, the group joined Linkin Park on a tour of Hong Kong and Singapore. Although they were requested by Linkin Park to open for their American tour as well, due to visa problems regarding the military service of some of the members, Pia was not able to join the tour.

Band members
Yohan (요한) : Vocal
Hullang (헐랭) : Guitar
Ki-Bum (기범) : Bass
SimZ (심지) : F.X (effects - Turntables, Samples, Keyboard, etc.)
Hyeseung (혜승) : Drum

Discography

Studio albums

EP

Singles
 "We Never Go Alone (Fight Song for Park JiSung)" (2010.05.17, Music Pia/Imperial)
 "Sonyeon" (2011.07.28, WinOne/Danal)
 "B.E.C.K." (2011.08.18, WinOne/Danal)
 "From This Black Day" (2012.07.23, WinOne/Danal)
 "Korean Anthem" (with Kim Jang Hoon) (2012.07.27, Concert World/LOEN)
 "Oasis" (오아시스) (with ZICO of Block B) (2012.09.17, WinOne/LOEN)
 "Make My Day" (2012.12.05, WinOne/Danal)
 "Nae Bom Eulo" (2013.03.19, WinOne/LOEN)
 "Don't Go" (2013.05.30, Forest Media/Pony Canyon)
 "O" (2013.06.27, WinOne/LOEN)
 "Storm Is Coming" (2015.03.24, WinOne Entertainment/Mirrorball Music)
 "Kuz (Re-Recording)" (28.10.2015, KongG Music)
 "SHINE" (16.06.2016, Mirrorball Music)
 "Jaoseon" (21.07.2016, Mirrorball Music)
 "Midnight Run" (26.07.2016, CJ E&M)
 "Storm Is Coming (1Piece Mix)" (25.01.2017, Mirrorball Music)

Guest appearances

Compilation appearances

Soundtrack appearances

Video game appearances

Videography
 "Stop" (2001)
 "Gloomy Sunday" (2003)
 "Where I [m]" (2003)
 "My Bed" (2005)
 "Cassandra" (2005)
 "Black Fish Swim" (2007)
 "The Oracle" (Fan Artwork Music Video)
 "Yes You Are" (Alex Wonsuk Choi version) (2011)
 "Yes You Are" (Rotta version) (2011)
 "From This Black Day" (2012)
 "Oasis" (2012)
 "Flower" (2013)
 "Don't Go" (2013)
 "O" (2013)
 "백색의 샤 (Shah The White)" (2015)
 "Shine" (2016)
 "Storm Is Coming (1Piece Mix)" (2017)

Awards

References

External links

  
 피아 (Pia) - 3rd Phase | Facebook

Nu metal musical groups
South Korean heavy metal musical groups
South Korean indie rock groups
Musical groups established in 1998
Musical groups from Busan